"Heartbeat" is a 1982 song written by Eric Kaz and Wendy Waldman. It was first recorded by Waldman and released on her 1982 album Which Way to Main Street. That same year, Australian-American singer Helen Reddy recorded the song for her 1983 album Imagination, the song failed to chart. 

The most famous rendition of the song is a 1986 cover of the song by Don Johnson, which was released as a single and included on Johnson's album Heartbeat. Johnson's cover became an international hit, peaking at number five on the Billboard Hot 100, and charting highly in many European countries. The song's popularity led to Johnson being named "the best new vocalist of 1986" in a Rolling Stone readers poll, and he released a music video interpreting the song, filmed with actress Lori Singer.

Helen Reddy version

In 1982, Australian-American singer Helen Reddy, who also has performed other songs from Kaz and Waldman covered the song for her 1983 studio album Imagination. It was recorded at Hollywood Sound Recorders Inc. In Hollywood, California, and was produced by Joe Wissert.  This was also one of her final songs on MCA Records Despite Imagination and 1981's Play Me Out failed to chart.

Personnel
David L. Kemper - drums
Neil Stubenhas - bass
Robbie Buchanan - acoustic piano
Martin Welsh - guitar

Don Johnson version

In 1986, American actor and singer Don Johnson recorded the song and included it on his debut album of the same name, releasing it as his debut single. It is the most successful version of the song, as well as becoming an international hit, peaking at number five on the Billboard Hot 100, and charting highly in many European countries. A music video was released featuring actress Lori Singer interpretating the song.

Track listings 

7" single
 "Heartbeat" - 4:18
 "Can't Take Your Memory" - 4:30
     
12" single
  "Heartbeat" - 4:18
  "Can't Take Your Memory" - 4:30
  "Coco Don't" - 3:33

Charts

Weekly charts

Year-end charts

References

External links 

1982 songs
1982 singles
1983 songs
1986 songs
1986 singles
1986 debut singles
Songs written by Eric Kaz
Songs written by Wendy Waldman
Helen Reddy songs